Rachel Kirkland (born September 29, 1992) is a Canadian former pair skater. With Eric Radford, she competed at a senior Grand Prix event, the 2008 Skate Canada International. Kirkland and Radford teamed up in 2005 and were coached by Brian Orser in Toronto, Canada and part-time by Ingo Steuer in Chemnitz, Germany. The 2006 Canadian junior silver medalists, they ended their partnership after finishing 7th at the 2009 Canadian Championships.

Programs
(With Radford)

Competitive highlights

Pair skating with Radford

Ice dancing with Lettner

References

External links

 

1992 births
Living people
Canadian female pair skaters
Figure skaters from Toronto